Emilios Riadis (original name Emilios Khu; ; 13 May 1880 – 17 July 1935) was a Greek composer.

Biography
Riadis was born in Thessaloniki, Ottoman Empire, now in Greece. He had his first music lesson in harmony and piano with a friend of Wagner's, Dimitrios Lalas. He also studied at the Munich Music Academy from 1908–1910. He studied form, instrumental and fugue with Walburnn, piano with Mayer-Schrey and choral singing with Becht and Stitch.

After finishing at the academy he moved to Paris and studied under Charpentier and Ravel (1910–1915). This was when he started appearing as the composer Riadis because he took the ending of his mother's maiden name, which was Elefteriadis. He was temporarily arrested at the beginning of World War I and resulted to his permanent move back to Thessaloniki. In 1915 he became a professor at the State Conservatory of Salonica. It is rumored that he was the sub-director, however there are no records indicating this.

Most of his works were for the stage, orchestra and chamber, but Riadis was famous for his songs. His songs were "distinguished by an expressive melodic line, somewhat oriental in its intervallic pattern; his harmonization’s are in the French manner". Most of his works, however, remained unfinished. He also gave a few lectures during the 1920s. In 1921/22 he lectured on Chinese music, in 1924 on Mozart and in 1926 on Ancient Egyptian music.  Riadis won the National Award for Arts and Letters in 1923.

He also made the orchestration of the Hymn of Aris Thessaloniki, of which he was a supporter.

Notes

References
Bohle, Bruce. The International Cyclopedia of Music and Musicians Emilios Riadis' (New York:Dodd, Mead and Co, 1985)
Sadie, Stanley. The New Grove Dictionary of Music and Musicians. "Emilios Riadis" (New York: Macmillan, 2001).
Slonimsky, Nicolas, Laura Kuhn, and Dennis McIntire. 'Riadis (real name Khu), Emilios.' Baker's Biographical Dictionary of Musicians Ed. Nicolas Slonimsky and Laura Khun. Vol 5. New York: Schirmer, 2001. 2975."Gale Virtual Reference Library" Web. 16 Feb. 2011

External links
 Athens News Article

Greek classical composers
Greek classical musicians
Greek National School
Musicians from Thessaloniki
Greek Macedonians
Greeks from the Ottoman Empire
Expatriates from the Ottoman Empire in Germany
Expatriates from the Ottoman Empire in France
1880s births
1935 deaths
Academy of Fine Arts, Munich alumni
Aris Thessaloniki
Male classical composers
20th-century male musicians
19th-century Greek musicians
20th-century Greek musicians